In logistics, a cross belt sorter is type of conveyor-based sortation system. It consists of a chain of independently operated short conveyor belts mounted transversely along the main track.

Types of cross belt sorters
There are a variety of different cross-belt sorters — each industry and each cross-belt sorter manufacturer can have unique products. Nevertheless, the standard two are horizontal cross-belt sorters and vertical cross-belt sorters. In both cases, current generations employ linear induction motor technology — this means they are simpler to operate, maintain, and endure less mechanical wear over time.
Horizontal cross-belt sorter. It is a device that sorts objects into bins, shelves, or stations according to the shape and size of the object. The machine consists of two large belts that move in opposite directions, with one belt at right angle to the other. Objects are sorted as they slide across these belts.
Vertical cross-belt sorter. It is a machine that sorts items of different sizes and shapes. It has two belts, one on top of the other, that move in opposite directions. The bottom belt moves forward while the top belt moves back. As items are inserted into the machine, they are carried by the belt to specific openings where they are sorted by size or shape.

References

Logistics
Industrial machinery